This article lists the films composed by Ilaiyaraaja in the 2010s.

Ilaiyaraaja 2010

Ilaiyaraaja 2011

Ilaiyaraaja 2012

Ilaiyaraaja 2013

Ilaiyaraaja 2014

Ilaiyaraaja 2015

Ilaiyaraaja 2016

Ilaiyaraaja 2017

Ilaiyaraaja 2018

Ilaiyaraaja 2019

Decade-wise Statistics

References

External links
 
 Raaja.com: The official Internet website of Ilaiyaraaja
 Collection of Ilayaraja songs at Paadal.com
 Collection of Ilayaraja Songs, Videos, Images and BGM

Indian songs
Discographies
Discographies of Indian artists